The Terror of Hallow's Eve is a 2017 American horror film directed by Todd Tucker and starring Caleb Thomas.

Cast
 Caleb Thomas as Tim Stevens
 Doug Jones as Trickster / Scarecrow
 Sarah Lancaster as Linda Stevens
 Annie Read as April
 J.T. Neal as Brian
 McAbe Gregg as "Spaz"
 Niko Papastefanou as Chuck
 Eric Roberts as Ed
 Juliet Landau as Nurse Pryse / Banshee In Shadows
 Peter Jason as Dr. Hamilton
 Christian Kane

Release
The film premiered at the London FrightFest Film Festival on August 28, 2017.  It was then released in the United States via Redbox on December 11, 2018.

Reception
The film has a 70% rating on Rotten Tomatoes.  Jeremy Aspinall of Radio Times awarded the film two stars out of five.  Gareth Jones of Dread Central awarded the film three stars out of five.  Benedict Seal of Bloody Disgusting awarded the film three and a half skulls out of five.

References

External links
 
 

American horror films
2017 horror films
Films scored by John Carpenter
2010s English-language films
2010s American films